is a former member of the Japanese idol girl group NMB48. She was a member of NMB48's Team M.

Career 
Yagura passed NMB48's second-generation auditions in May 2011, and debuted on 5 June 2011. Her stage debut was on 13 August 2011. She was first selected for NMB48's Senbatsu for the single "Oh My God!". In January 2012, Yagura was selected to form Team M. In April 2013, she started holding an AKB48 concurrent position in Team A.

In the 2013 general elections, Yagura ranked for the first time, placing 44th with 16,281 votes. In the 2014 general elections, she placed 41st with 18,596 votes.

In September 2014, it was announced she and Miru Shiroma would be the centers for NMB48's 10th single Rashikunai.

On October 11, 2017, Yagura announced her graduation during the NMB48 Arena Tour 2017. She graduated from the group on April 10, 2018, by the last performance at the NMB48 theatre, and retired from the entertainment industry.

In 2019, it was announced that Yagura would return to the entertainment industry. She appeared in episode 5 of the drama Hakui no Senshi, which was aired on May 15.

In 2020, she launched her YouTube channel.

Discography

NMB48 singles

AKB48 singles

Appearances

Stage units
NMB48 Kenkyuusei Stage 
 
NMB48 Team M 1st Stage 
 
AKB48 Team A Waiting Stage
 
AKB48 Team A 5th Stage  (Revival)
 
NMB48 Team M 2nd Stage "Reset"

TV variety
  (2012)
  (2013)
  (2014)
  (2013–2017)
 AKBingo! (2014–2017)
  (2014)

TV dramas
  (2013)
  (2015) as Kurobara
  (2015) as Kurobara
 Ep.37 - SNS (2016) as Yuri
 Ep.12 - Blue Photo Club (2016) as Chihiro
   (2016) as Kurobara

Movies
  (2013)
  (2014)
Jojoen (2018)

References

External links
 
 

1997 births
Living people
Japanese YouTubers
Japanese idols
Japanese women pop singers
People from Osaka Prefecture
Musicians from Osaka Prefecture
NMB48 members
21st-century Japanese women singers
21st-century Japanese singers